

Rough and Ready may refer to:

"Old Rough and Ready", a nickname for U.S. President Zachary Taylor

Geography

United States
Rough and Ready, California, a census-designated place in Nevada County
Rough and Ready, Georgia (present-day Mountain View, Georgia), an unincorporated community in Clayton County
Rough and Ready, New York, a hamlet in the town of Greenwood
Rough and Ready, Pennsylvania, an unincorporated town in Schuylkill County
Ruff and Ready Island Naval Supply Depot  Stockton, California
Etna, California, originally named Rough and Ready

Books, film and TV
Rough and Ready, a 19th-century novel by Horatio Alger, Jr.
Rough and Ready (1918 film), a silent film western
Rough and Ready (1927 film), an American silent western film
The Ruff and Reddy Show, an American animated television series

Music
Rough and Ready (album), an album by The Jeff Beck Group
Rough & Ready Volume 1, an album by Shabba Ranks
Rough & Ready Volume 2
Ruff and Ready: Live in Manchester, a DVD by Sonic Boom Six
Rough 'n' Ready, triple-CD DVD  Bernie Marsden

Songs
"Old Rough and Ready Quickstep", an 1846 song by Charles Grobe
"Rough & Ready", a 1973 country single by Peggy Sue (singer)
"Rough & Ready", a 2004 song by Trace Adkins from Comin' On Strong